Preston is a constituency represented in the House of Commons of the UK Parliament since 2000 by Sir Mark Hendrick, a member of the Labour Party and Co-operative Party.

History
1295–1950
The seat was created for the Model Parliament and sent members until at least 1331 until a new (possibly confirmatory) grant of two members to Westminster followed.  From 1529 extending unusually beyond the 19th century until the 1950 general election the seat had two-member representation. Party divisions tended to run stronger after 1931 before which two different parties' candidates frequently came first and second at elections under the bloc vote system.

In 1929, a recently elected Liberal, Sir William Jowitt decided to join the Labour Party and called for a by-election (which implies a single vacancy) to support this change of party, which he won, to take up for two years the position of Attorney General of England and Wales as part of the Government. He became the highest judge during the Attlee Ministry, the Lord High Chancellor of Great Britain and Speaker of the House of Lords under a then hereditary-dominated House leading to a Conservative majority.  Consequently, he was selected to be elevated to a peerage as 1st Earl Jowitt.  With no sons, he was to be the last Earl and wrote the Dictionary of English Law.

1950–1983
Preston was abolished as a constituency by the House of Commons (Redistribution of Seats) Act 1949 being replaced by Preston North and Preston South constituencies.

1983–present
The representatives since the seat's revival after 33 years of being split between (larger area) North and South seats have all been members of the Labour Party.

The member from 1987 to 2000 was Audrey Wise, a member of the Socialist Campaign Group and reformer of maternity healthcare in opposition on the Select Committee.

Boundaries

1832–1868: The old borough of Preston, and the township of Fishwick.

1868–1885: The existing parliamentary borough, excluding such part (if any) as lies on the south side of the River Ribble.

1885–1918: The existing parliamentary borough, so much of the municipal borough of Preston as was not already included in the parliamentary borough, so much of the parish of Lea, Ashton, Ingol, and Cottam, and of the parish of Penwortham, as were added to the municipal borough of Preston on 1 June 1889 by the Ribble Navigation and Preston Dock Act 1883, and the local government district of Fulwood.

1983–1997: The Borough of Preston wards of Ashton, Avenham, Brookfield, Central, Deepdale, Fishwick, Ingol, Larches, Moorbrook, Park, Ribbleton, St John's, St Matthew's, and Tulketh.

1997–2010: The Borough of Preston wards of Ashton, Avenham, Brookfield, Central, Deepdale, Fishwick, Larches, Moor Park, Ribbleton, Riversway, St Matthew's, and Tulketh, and the Borough of South Ribble wards of Bamber Bridge Central, Bamber Bridge South, and Walton-le-Dale.

2010–present: The City of Preston wards of Ashton, Brookfield, Deepdale, Fishwick, Ingol, Larches, Moor Park, Ribbleton, Riversway, St George's, St Matthew's, Town Centre, Tulketh, and University.

The composition of the Preston constituency was confirmed in time for the 2010 United Kingdom general election as part of the Fifth Periodic Review of Westminster constituencies. While it previously crossed the River Ribble to include Bamber Bridge and Walton-le-Dale from South Ribble District, the seat now falls within the City boundaries.

History
In the late 19th Century the boundaries of the two-member Preston constituency were described as comprising:

...[T]he old Borough of Preston, the township of Fishwick, so much of the Municipal Borough as is not included in the Parliamentary Borough, the Local Government District of Fulwood, and so much of the parishes of Lea, Ashton, Ingol, and Cotham {sic}, and Penwortham, as will be added to the Municipal Borough of Preston on June 1st, 1889 

In the Representation of the People Act, 1918 the boundaries of the two-member constituency were described as the:

 County borough of Preston and urban district of Fulwood:

The single seat of Preston formed from 1918 until 1949 was created by the County Borough of Preston and Urban District of Fulwood. From the general election of 1950 to the 1983 Preston was divided into the constituencies of Preston North and Preston South. In time for the 1983 general election, the boundaries on which the current seat is drawn were confirmed. The northern, Fulwood area, was divided between Fylde and Ribble Valley.

Changes for 2010
The ward of Lea is within the constituency of Fylde.

The wards of Preston Rural North, Preston Rural East and the Fulwood wards (Cadley, College, Garrison, Greyfriars and Sharoe Green) are within the constituency of Wyre and Preston North. By the end of the review, the newly recommended Preston constituency had the smallest number of voters of an English constituency based on 2006 electorates.

Modifications in 2018
The Local Government Boundary Commission for England modified Preston City Council's ward boundaries in 2018, which in some minor cases altered which wards crossed the Parliamentary boundary of Preston. Due to the changes, the constituency of Preston, as of 2018, is made from:

In full: Ashton, Brookfield, City Centre, Deepdale, Fishwick and Frenchwood, Plungington, Ribbleton, St Matthews.
In part: Cadley (shared with Wyre and Preston North), Ingol and Cottam (shared with Fylde),  Lea and Larches (shared with Fylde),

Members of Parliament

MPs 1295–1640

MPs 1640–1950

MPs since 1983

Overview
Representatives have sat in Parliament for Preston for nearly 800 years, the first recorded names being Willielmus fil' Pauli and Adam Russel.  Prior to being reformed as "Preston" in 1983, the former Preston North and Preston South seats were amongst the most marginal in the country - in 1979, Conservative Robert Atkins won Preston North by 29 votes.

With the suburban, middle class former Fulwood Urban District area within Ribble Valley (and from 2010 Wyre and Preston North), the southern portion has awarded MPs with much healthier and secure majorities. Almost all of Preston's representatives from 1915 to 1950, and since its recreation as a single constituency in 1983, have been Labour candidates.

Between 1918 and 1949, the two-seat constituency of Preston was formed by the County Borough of Preston and the Urban District of Fulwood. In 1997, Audrey Wise secured a majority of over 18,000. The collapse of the Conservative vote - 10 percentage points down from 1992 - was firmly with the pattern of the Tory fortunes in that year.

The death of Audrey Wise in 2000 triggered a by-election. At that Preston by-election, Mark Hendrick, former Member of the European Parliament (MEP) for the Lancashire Central constituency with Preston at its heart, secured a victory with a 4,400 majority. The surprise of the night was the result of the fledgling Socialist Alliance, for whom Terry Cartright saved his deposit.

Less than a year later, the 2001 general election returned Mark Hendrick with a much healthier 12,200 majority, up against South Ribble councillor Graham O'Hare for the Conservatives and the then local Liberal Democrat leader Bill Chadwick. In real terms, all three main parties lost support from 1997 - Labour down by over 8,000 votes, Conservatives reduced by over 2,200 and Lib Dems 2,300 lower. One notable candidate in 2001 was David Braid, also a candidate in a number of other seats that year, who had been the "Battle for Britain" candidate in the previous year's by-election.

The 2005 general election was notable for the changes in share of the vote of the minor parties. The first ever Respect candidate, local councillor Michael Lavalette, firmly saved his deposit with nearly 7% of the vote. The Liberal Democrats had chosen former Conservative County Councillor William Parkinson, and had their best result since 1997. Fiona Bryce for the Conservatives, remained in second place seeing her share of the vote remain stable despite the United Kingdom Independence Party (UKIP) polling over 1,000 votes. Mark Hendrick secured another term as MP, although his vote total was 3,000 less than 2001 and 12,000 less than Audrey Wise in 1997.

Labour continued to represent Preston at the elections of 2010, 2015, and 2017. Whilst Mark Hendrick secured less than 50% of the votes cast in 2010, the first time this has occurred at a Preston election since 1983, subsequent results had much stronger Labour majorities. Second place went back to the Conservative Party, regaining from the Liberal Democrats who took second place for the first time in 2010.

Elections

Elections in the 2010s

Elections in the 2000s

Elections in the 1990s

Elections of the 1980s

Elections in the 1940s

For the general election expected to take place in 1939/1940, the following candidates had been selected;
Conservative: Adrian Moreing, Edward Cobb
Labour: P.C. Hoffman, John William Sunderland

Elections in the 1930s

Elections in the 1920s

Elections in the 1910s 
For all General Elections from 1906 to 1929 the Liberal and Labour parties ran only one candidate each, and these candidates ran in harness.

General Election 1914/15:

Another General Election was required to take place before the end of 1915. The political parties had been making preparations for an election to take place and by the July 1914, the following candidates had been selected; 
Unionist: George Stanley and Alfred Tobin
Labour: Tom Shaw
Liberal: Frederick Llewellyn-Jones

 Cox was replaced as Liberal candidate by Gorst - due to his frequent criticism of Liberal social policy - but chose to run independently.

Elections in the 1900s

Elections in the 1890s

Elections in the 1880s 

 Caused by Raikes' resignation to seek election in the 1882 Cambridge University by-election.

 Caused by Holker's resignation upon appointment as a Lord Justice of Appeal.

 Caused by Hermon's death.

Elections in the 1870s

 Caused by Holker's appointment as Solicitor General for England and Wales.

 

 

 Caused by Hesketh's death.

Elections in the 1860s

 

 Caused by Cross' resignation.

Elections in the 1850s

Elections in the 1840s

Elections in the 1830s

 

 

 

 

 

 Caused by Smith-Stanley's appointment as Chief Secretary for Ireland

Elections in the 1810s

See also
List of parliamentary constituencies in Lancashire
1903 Preston by-election
1915 Preston by-election
1929 Preston by-election
1936 Preston by-election
1940 Preston by-election
2000 Preston by-election

Notes

References

Sources
Robert Beatson, A Chronological Register of Both Houses of Parliament (London: Longman, Hurst, Res & Orme, 1807) 
D Brunton & D H Pennington, Members of the Long Parliament (London: George Allen & Unwin, 1954)
Cobbett's Parliamentary history of England, from the Norman Conquest in 1066 to the year 1803 (London: Thomas Hansard, 1808) 
 The Constitutional Year Book for 1913 (London: National Union of Conservative and Unionist Associations, 1913)
F W S Craig, British Parliamentary Election Results 1832-1885 (2nd edition, Aldershot: Parliamentary Research Services, 1989)
 F W S Craig, British Parliamentary Election Results 1918-1949 (Glasgow: Political Reference Publications, 1969)
 Maija Jansson (ed.), Proceedings in Parliament, 1614 (House of Commons) (Philadelphia: American Philosophical Society, 1988)
 J E Neale, The Elizabethan House of Commons (London: Jonathan Cape, 1949)
 J Holladay Philbin, Parliamentary Representation 1832 - England and Wales (New Haven: Yale University Press, 1965)
Henry Stooks Smith, The Parliaments of England from 1715 to 1847 (2nd edition, edited by FWS Craig - Chichester: Parliamentary Reference Publications, 1973)

Parliamentary constituencies in North West England
Constituencies of the Parliament of the United Kingdom established in 1295
Constituencies of the Parliament of the United Kingdom disestablished in 1950
Constituencies of the Parliament of the United Kingdom established in 1983
Politics of Preston
Politics of South Ribble